Zoe Scofield is a choreographer and dancer best known for her work with Juniper Shuey with whom she is co-director of zoe|juniper, a Seattle-based dance and visual art company.  Her work is characterized by multi-media, cross-genre works utilizing stage performance, video installation, photography and complex technical elements.

References

External links
zoe|juniper
National Dance Project
Archival footage of Zoe/Juniper performing A Crack in Everything in 2011 at Jacob's Pillow

American choreographers
Living people
People from Seattle
Year of birth missing (living people)